In the run up to the 2021 Israeli legislative election, various organisations carry out opinion polling to gauge voting intention in Israel during the term of the 23rd Knesset. This article lists the results of such polls.

The date range for these opinion polls is from the previous election, held on 2 March 2020, to the present day. Due to the political deadlock which resulted after the previous election, and the possibility of a fourth consecutive snap election, polling for the 2021 election started 10 days after the previous election. The election is scheduled on 23 March 2021. No polls may be published from the end of the Friday before the election (19 March in this case) until the polling stations close on election day at 22:00.

Polls are listed in reverse chronological order, showing the most recent first and using the dates when the survey fieldwork was done, as opposed to the date of publication. Where the fieldwork dates are unknown, the date of publication is given instead. The highest figure in each polling survey is displayed with its background shaded in the leading party's colour. If a tie ensues, this is applied to the highest figures. When a poll has no information on a certain party, that party is instead marked by a dash (–).

Seat projections 
This section displays voting intention estimates referring to the 2021 Knesset election. The figures listed are Knesset seat counts rather than percentages, unless otherwise stated.

Polling graph 
This graph shows the polling trends from the 2 March 2020 Israeli legislative election until the next election day using a 4-poll moving average. Scenario polls are not included here.

For parties not crossing the electoral threshold (currently 3.25%) in any given poll, the number of seats is calculated as a percentage of the 120 total seats. Labor-Meretz-Gesher and Labor-Meretz are shown as Labor before the splits; Yesh Atid-Telem is shown as Yesh Atid before the split. Derekh Eretz is shown separately until December 2020, when it merged into New Hope. Religious Zionist includes Otzma Yehudit and Noam.

Polls 
Poll results are listed in the table below. Parties that fall below the electoral threshold of 3.25% are denoted by the percentage of votes that they received (N%), rather than the number of seats they would have gotten.

61 seats are required for a majority in the Knesset.

Legend
 Gov.
— Sum of the 35th government parties: Likud, Blue & White, Shas, United Torah Judaism (UTJ), Labor (not including MK Merav Michaeli), Derekh Eretz, Jewish Home and Gesher.

Legend
 Gov.
— Sum of the 34th government parties: Likud, Shas, United Torah Judaism (UTJ), and Yamina.

61 seats are required for a majority in the Knesset.

Note: The composition of the current government does not necessarily determine the exact makeup of the post-election government.

Scenario polls 
Most often, opinion polling about hypothetical scenarios is done in the same survey as for the regular polling. This is why these scenario polls are paired for comparison purposes.

Labor, The Israelis & Tnufa merger

Religious Zionist Party, The Jewish Home & Otzma Yehudit merger and Ra'am split from the Joint List

Religious Zionist Party, Otzma Yehudit & Noam merger and Joint List reunification

Labor & Israelis merger and Joint List reunification

Religious Zionist Party & The Jewish Home merger and Joint List reunification

Labor, The Israelis, Tnufa, New Economic Party & Telem merger

Yesh Atid & The Israelis merger

Yamina-New Hope merger

Religious Zionist Party, The Jewish Home & Otzma Yehudit merger

The Israelis & Labor merger

Tzipi Livni joining Yesh Atid and The Israelis, Labor, Telem & Tnufa merger

Religious Zionist Party & Otzma Yehudit merger

Labor with The Israelis, Yesh Atid, Blue & White, New Economic Party and Tnufa

Ehud Barak leading Labor

Yesh Atid-Telem & The Israelis merger and New Hope & Yamina merger

Religious Zionist Party split from Yamina

Yesh Atid-Telem & The Israelis merger

Labor with The Israelis, Yesh Atid, Meretz and Ofer Shelah

Labor with Ofer Shelah, Ron Huldai and Avi Nissenkorn

Blue and White without Benny Gantz and Gabi Ashkenazi

Ron Huldai party and Ra'am split from Joint List

Ron Huldai party

Gadi Eizenkot joining New Hope

Ron Huldai, Gadi Eizenkot & Moshe Ya'alon party

Blue and White & Yesh Atid-Telem reunification

Gadi Eizenkot & Yifat Shasha-Biton joining New Hope

Ron Huldai joining Yesh Atid-Telem

Gadi Eizenkot & Ron Huldai party

Gadi Eizenkot party

Gadi Eizenkot & Ron Huldai party and Yifat Shasha-Biton party

Yifat Shasha-Biton party

Ofer Shelah leading Yesh Atid

Gabi Ashkenazi leading Blue & White

Gadi Eizenkot leading Blue & White

Shulman party

Prime minister 
Due to the political deadlock, Shas chairman and Interior Minister Aryeh Deri suggested direct elections for prime minister. Some opinion pollsters have asked voters which party leader they would prefer as prime minister. Their responses are given as percentages in the graphs and tables below.

Graphs 
Included below are polls including Netanyahu, Lapid, Gantz and Bennet. Only such polls which distinguish undecided voters from those who support other candidates affect the "None" and "Don't know" values.

This graph shows the polling trends from the 2 March 2020 Israeli legislative election until the next election day using 4-poll moving average.

Polls 
Various candidates

Netanyahu vs. Sa'ar

Netanyahu vs. Lapid

Netanyahu vs. Bennett

Netanyahu vs. Gantz

Netanyahu vs. Huldai

Netanyahu vs. Eizenkot

Coalition 
Some opinion pollsters have asked voters which coalition they would prefer. The tables below list their responses as percentages.

Minority government backed by the Joint List

General

Notes

References

Opinion polling in Israel